Wincon was a series of British science fiction conventions, initially envisaged as a one-off entry in the Unicon science fiction convention sequence (1980 onwards) but which subsequently took on a life of its own as an occasional event held at King Alfred's College, Winchester. The first was held in 1988 (aka Unicon 9), the most recent in 1999. Guests have included Patrick Tilley, Geoff Ryman, Michael de Larrabeiti, Bruce Sterling, Josef Nesvadba, Gwyneth Jones, Brian Stableford, Colin Greenland, Norman Spinrad, Patrick Hogan, Diana Wynne Jones and Warren Ellis.

Although not officially the fourth Wincon, 1997 Eastercon (held in Liverpool) was organised by most of the core group, which includes Phil Plumbly, John Richards, Peter Wright, Anne-Marie Wright, Steve Green, Andy Croft, Keith Cosslett and John Bark. Other committee members have included Mike Cheater, Joy Hibbert, Dave Rowley, Peter Cohen, Terry Hunt, and Geoff Hill.

The guests at Intervention were Brian W Aldiss, David Langford, Octavia Butler and Jon Bing. The next instalment (back in St Alfred's College) recognised this relationship by its title, "Wincon V"; it completed the circle by also being part of the Unicon cycle.

There are no current plans to revive the Wincon series, as many of the original organisers are now scattered across the UK, but it remains one of England's more significant regional science fiction conventions.

References

Defunct science fiction conventions
1988 establishments in England
1999 disestablishments in England